The Arizona Department of Juvenile Corrections (ADJC) is a state agency of Arizona, headquartered in Downtown Phoenix.

Adobe Mountain School is the only secure facility managed by the agency and is an associate member of the Arizona Interscholastic Association. The Adobe Mountain School has units for both boys and girls.

The agency houses and treats seriously delinquent, violent, and Seriously Mentally Ill youth who have been committed by the Juvenile Courts, up to 19 years of age. Committed delinquents are screened for psychological, medical, social, and criminal factors, and provided with the necessary programming and treatment to make them capable of being productive members of society. Youth who successfully complete rehabilitation are eligible to be released on parole, where they are supervised by parole officers, usually in their home community.

The agency previously operated facilities in Pima County (Catalina) and in Buckeye (Eagle Point), Eagle Point School was in the complex. and a girls-only unit adjacent to the Adobe Mountain facility (Black Canyon). The facilities, except for Adobe Mountain, closed in 2009–10.

The ADJC has had 3 different directors since 2013, Charles Flanagan, Dona Marie Markley, and current Director Jeff Hood.

References

External links

 Arizona Department of Juvenile Corrections

Juvenile detention centers in the United States
Juvenile Corrections
State corrections departments of the United States